Sekido is a Japanese surname. Notable people with the surname include:

, Japanese footballer
, Japanese swimmer
, Japanese skier

Japanese-language surnames